Hydroquinone 1,2-dioxygenase (hydroquinone dioxygenase) is an enzyme with systematic name benzene-1,4-diol:oxygen 1,2-oxidoreductase (decyclizing). This enzyme catalyses the following chemical reaction

 benzene-1,4-diol + O2  (2E,4Z)-4-hydroxy-6-oxohexa-2,4-dienoate

The enzyme is an extradiol-type dioxygenase. It belongs to the nonheme-iron(II)-dependent dioxygenase family.

References

External links 
 

EC 1.13.11